Yellowknife is the capital city of the Northwest Territories, Canada.

Yellowknife may also refer to:

Yellowknife River, a river in the Northwest Territories, Canada
Yellowknives, a tribe of North American indigenous people who gave their name to the city
Yellowknife (administrative district), a former electoral district in the Northwest Territories, Canada
HMCS Yellowknife, a Canadian coastal defence vessel
Yellowknife (film), a 2002 film by Canadian director Rodrigue Jean

See also